Tejupilco is a municipality in the State of Mexico, Mexico, located approximately  southwest of the state capital Toluca, along Federal Highway 134. Its municipal seat is Tejupilco de Hidalgo. The 2005 census recorded a population of 62,547 inhabitants.

Tejupilco was the first municipalities founded in April 1829.

Dating from before the Spanish Conquest, indigenous groups such as Otomi, Mazahua and Matlatzinca have lived in the area now contained by the modern municipality. A number of pre-Columbian archaeological sites within the municipal boundaries are known, but as yet little investigated. The name "Tejupilco" derives from Nahuatl and means "in the toes."

Main economic activities are in the agricultural and local retail sectors. Agriculture is the most significant, with some   under cultivation. Commerce and retail ranks as the second-most productive economic sector.

A market held each Sunday is a main retail venue, where products and crafts typical of the region are sold.

The typical gastronomy of the region includes a bread known as "niguas", which is made with natural fruit.

Demography

As municipal seat, Tejupilco de Hidalgo has governing authority over the following communities: 
 
Acamuchitlán
Aguacate-Monte de Dios
Almoloya de las Granadas
La Angostura Primera
Las Anonas
Antimonio Pantoja
Santiago Arizmendi (Arizmendi)
Arballo
Barranca de Ixtapan
Bejucos
Cacahuananche
Cerro de Cacalotepec (Cacalotepec)
Campanario de Ixtapan (El Campanario)
La Cañada
Cañadas de San Simón (Cañada de Chivas)
Rincón de Carboneras (Carboneras)
Cerro de los Elizaldes
El Cirián de la Laguna (El Cirián)
El Ciruelo
El Corupo
Cuadrilla de López
Cuadrilla de los Martínez (Los Martínez)
Los Melchores de San Lucas (Los Melchores)
La Florida (Kilómetro Cinco)
Santa Rosa (Las Juntas)
Los Cuervos
Cuevillas
Epazotes
La Estancia de Ixtapan
San Miguel Ixtapan
Jalpan (Jalpan San Simón)
La Joya de San Lucas
Juluapan (Juloapan)
La Labor de Zaragoza
Llano Grande
El Mamey de San Lucas
Mazatepec
La Mesa
Las Mesas de Ixtapan (Las Mesas)
Monte de Dios
San Andrés Ocotepec
Ojo de Agua (Rincón de Ugarte)
La Palma Cuata (La Palma)
Pantoja
Paso del Guayabal (El Paso)
Paso de Vigas
Plan del Puente
El Platanal (El Platanal de San Lucas)
Plaza de Gallos
El Potrero de Ixtapan (El Potrero)
Potrero Grande
Puerto del Aire
Rincón de Aguirre
Rincón del Guayabal
Rincón del Carmen
Lodo Prieto
Rincón de Ugarte
Río Chiquito
Río de Aquiagua (Aquiagua)
Río Grande
Salitre de Acamuchitlán (El Salitre)
San Gabriel Pantoja
San José de la Laguna
San Lucas del Maíz (San Lucas)
San Mateo (San Mateo Ixtapan)
Sauz de San Lucas (El Sauz)
Tejapan Limones (Tejapan)
Tenería (Pueblo Nuevo)
Tirados
Zacatepec
El Zapote de Ixtapan (El Zapote)
Las Juntas del Salto
Llano Grande (Llano Grande de San Lucas)
Salitre de San Lucas
El Salto (El Salto Dos)
El Sauz Ocotepec (El Sauz)
Suquitila
Rincón de Jaimes
Las Ánimas
Las Juntas
Ilamos
El Picacho del Rincón del Guayabal
Cuadrilla de Leones
Barro Prieto
El Zapote de Acamuchitlán (El Zapote)
Agua Bendita
Ocoyapan
La Parota (Rancho las Parotas)
Cerro Gordo
Los Nopales
Jumiltepec
Mesa de Gallos (El Llano)
Potrero del Guayabal
Puerto de Jalpan (Jalpa)
San Francisco
Los Baños
La Calera
El Carmen de Ixtapan
La Cabecera (Cabecera de los Arrayanes)
La Cuitacera
La Guitarra
Hacienda de Ixtapan
Las Ilamas
Las Juntas de Ixtapan
Naranjo
Chiquito
El Naranjo Grande
Paredes Prietas
Los Pericones
Los Pinzanes (La Pinzanera)
Rincón de San Gabriel
Salto Grande
Santa María de las Flores
Tonatilco
Zapote del Ancón
Agua Negra
Fundadora de San Lucas del Maíz
Rancho las Moras (Las Moras)
Cerro Alto (Milpa Vieja)
Piedra Ancha
Plan de Maguey
Cuadrilla del Molino
Paso de la Parota
La Cofradía (Los Mangos)
Planes de la Cofradía (Los Planes)
La Calera
El Guayabo
La Bolsa
Coahuilotes
Paso de San Juan
Cerro del Chirimoyo
Pinzán Morado
El Rodeo
Limón de San Lucas del Maíz
Encinos Verdes
Antonio de San Lucas del Maíz
Cerro de Mazatepec
Cerro del Divisadero
Cerro de los Huérfanos
La Laguna de Mazatepec
El Limón de la Estancia
El Ocote
Las Mesas de los Capires (Las Mesas)
Puerto la Piedra Labrada (Pto. de Carboneras)
Puerto Madroño
El Capire (Colonia el Capire)
Lomas de Tejupilco
Colonia México Sesenta y Ocho
Juntas de Zacatepec (El Pedregal 2a. Mza.)
Rincón de López
El Capire de Pantoja
Col. Benito Juárez (Lázaro Cárdenas del Río)
El Cuagüilote Ojo de Agua (La Pera)
El Jumate
Santa Rosa Rincón de Jaimes
Rincón del Naranjo-La Cabecera
Antimonio
Colonia Buenavista Primera Sección
El Puerto del Blanqueadero (Peñas Pintas)
Rincón el Sauz Ocotepec
Rinconada de la Labor
El Burrito (El Sauz)
Las Lomas (Los Depósitos)
El Molino del Salto (Galera del Molino)
Rincón Chiquito
Los Colorines
El Salitre Segunda Sección

It borders Otzoloapan, Zacazonapan, Temascaltepec, San Simón de Guerrero, Amatepec, Sultepec, Texcaltitlán as well as with the states of Michoacán and Guerrero to the west.

References